John Wilhelm Rowntree (4 September 1868 – 9 March 1905) was a chocolate and confectionery manufacturer and Quaker religious activist and reformer.

Life
He was born on 4 September 1868 in York, the eldest son of Joseph Rowntree (1836–1925) and his second wife, Antoinette Seebohm (1846–1924).

He was educated at Bootham School, York and Oliver's Mount School, Scarborough

He was a successful businessman, vastly expanding the already successful family chocolate business. He played a large part in enabling the Religious Society of Friends to incorporate an understanding of modern science (such as the theory of evolution), modern biblical criticism, and the social meaning of Jesus's teaching into their belief systems. He helped establish Woodbrooke, the Quaker study centre in Bournville, Birmingham.

He died on 9 March 1905 in New York.

Son
His only son Lawrence was killed in action during the Great War. Originally a volunteer orderly with the Friends' Ambulance Unit at Dunkirk, he subsequently joined the British Army and fought in the first tank action at Flers–Courcelette on 15 September 1916 as a member of the crew of HMLS Creme-de-Menthe.  He was later commissioned into the Royal Field Artillery and was killed on 25 November 1917 in the Ypres Salient.

Publications
 A History of the Adult School Movement (with Henry Bryan Binns). 1903.
 Essays and addresses. 1905.
 The Lay Ministry
 Man's Relation to God, and other addresses ... With life of the author (compiled by S. Elizabeth Robson from the introductions written by Joshua Rowntree to "Essays and Addresses" and "Palestine Notes" 1917)
 Palestine Notes, and other papers ... Edited by Joshua Rowntree.1906.
 Present Day Papers. Vol. 1 edited ... by J. W. Rowntree. (Vol. 2–5, etc., edited by J. W. Rowntree and H. B. Binns.).1898-1902.

References

External links
 The Rowntree Society

People educated at Bootham School
English Quakers
1868 births
1905 deaths
John Wilhelm
19th-century British philanthropists
People from York
19th-century English businesspeople